Purchase Line High School, named for the boundary line  set by William Penn in the late 1700s and the small village surrounding the school, was established in 1954 and serves students in northeast Indiana and southwest Clearfield counties.

Vocational Education
Students in grades 10-12 have the opportunity to attend the Indiana County Technology Center in White Township for part of their school day if they wish to obtain training in a specific area that the ICTC offers.

Extracurriculars
The Purchase Line School District offers a wide variety of clubs, activities and an extensive sports program.

Clubs
The following clubs are available at Purchase Line 
 FBLA
 Newspaper
 Iron Club
 Foreign Language
 Pep Club
 Yearbook
 Music Club
 Student Council
 Science Club
 National Honor Society
 Varsity Club
 SADD
 Quiz Bowl
 Scholastic Scrimmage
 Heritage Conference Science Competition

Athletics
Purchase Line is in PIAA District 6's Heritage Conference:
 Baseball - Class A
 Basketball - Class AA
 Cross Country - Class AA
 Football - Class A
 Softball - Class A
 Track and Field - Class AA
 Volleyball - Class A

Junior High Athletics
Students in Grades 7-8 may participate in non-championship play in the following sports:
 Basketball
 Football
 Volleyball

References

Schools in Indiana County, Pennsylvania
Public high schools in Pennsylvania
Public middle schools in Pennsylvania
Educational institutions established in 1954
1954 establishments in Pennsylvania